Taksaorn Paksukcharern (RTGS: Thaksa-on Phaksukcharoen) is a Thai actress and model who has starred in several lakorns. She is known for her roles in the 2008 version of Jam Loey Rak as well as the title character in Wanida (2010), which won Best Foreign Series at the International Drama Festival in Tokyo. She graduated with BA from Chulalongkorn University.

Personal life
In 2012, she married a lieutenant and playboy from a wealthy family, Songkran Taechanarong. They lived separately for over a year after Mr.Taechanarong's affair was exposed. The actress filed for divorce on September 25, 2018. Now she is a single mom and lives with her daughter, Peemai Taechanarong, born in 2015. Songkran's brother, Pupaa Taechanarong is dating the CH3 actress Chalida Vijitvongthong.

Education
Elementary:  Patai Udom Suksa School
Secondary: Rajinibon School
Bachelor's degree in Communications, Chulalongkorn University

Filmography

Television

 Mit Chaibancha MayaCheevit (with Akara Amarttayakul)
 Risaya (with Job Nithi) (2003)
 Phoo Chai Mue Song (with Chai Chattayodom Hiranyatthiti) (2004)
 Puen Rak (with Karunpon Tieansuwan) (2005)
 Mon Rak Lottery (with Worrawech Danuwong) (2006)
 Tee Takul Song (with Gig Danai) (2006)
 Jom Jai (with Dom Hetrakul) (2007)
 Meuh Dok Rak Ban (with Mart Krissada) (2007)
 Jam Leoy Rak (with Aum Atichart) (2008)
 Botan Gleep Sudtai (with Aum Atichart) (2008)
 Jai Rao (with Ken Theeradej Wongpuapan) (2008)
 Prajan See Roong (with Bie Sukrit Wisetkaew) (2009)
 Namtan Mai (with Aum Atichart) (2009)
 Wanida (with Tik Jesdaporn Pholdee) (2010)
 Roy Mai (with Aum Atichart) (2011)
 Rak Prakasit (with Natthawut Skidjai) (2012)
 Kor kerd mai klai klai ter (2020)

Film

 King Naresuan Part I: Hongsawadee's Hostage (2007)
 King Naresuan Part II: Reclamation of Sovereignty (2007)
 Bangkok Metro Love Story (2009)
 King Naresuan Part III: Naval Battle (2011)
 King Naresuan Part IV: The Nanda Bayin War (2011)
 King Naresuan Part V: Elephant Battle (2014)
 King Naresuan Part VI: The End of Hong Sa (2015)

Advertisement

 Garnier
 Toyota
 SB Furniture (with Ken Teeradej)
 SB Design Square (with Araya Alberta Hargate)
 Tropicana Twister (with Rome Patchata)

References

External links
 Aff Taksaorn Fan Club
 Aff Taksaorn Chinese Fan Club

1980 births
Living people
Taksaorn Paksukcharern
Taksaorn Paksukcharern
Taksaorn Paksukcharern
Taksaorn Paksukcharern
Taksaorn Paksukcharern